Julie Bernard (known as Li, born 1990 Le Port, Réunion) is a Réunionnais illustrator of children's books. In Reunion, she won the 2019 Vanille Prize in the Illustration category for two titles, Le livre des métiers: un imaginaire pour matin and Z’oiseaus rares. She won a 2020 UNICEF prize for children's literature, for Le livre des métiers.

Life 
Her parents are creative artisans; Julie Bernard studied graphic arts at the Auguste Renoir school in Paris and at the Académie Royale des Beaux-Arts. She graduated in 2015 with a masters in illustration. She now works as a freelance artist, author, and illustrator, including children's books. Her colorful and poetic graphic universe is noticed abroad where she has obtained several prizes.

Works 

 Une goutte de pluie dans l’océan, auto-édition, 2016
 60 questions étonnantes sur l'amour: et les réponses qu'y apporte la science, with Marc Olano (text), éditions Mardaga, 2016 )
 Le livre des métiers : un imaginaire pour demain, éditions Zébulo, 2018
 Robinson et l’arbre de vie, avec Alain Serres (texte), éditions Rue du monde, 2019
 Le livre des beautés minuscules : 36 poèmes pour murmurer la beauté du monde, with Carl Norac (text), éditions Rue du monde, 2019
 Z’oiseaux rares, avec Fabienne Jonca (text), éditions Zébulo, 2019

References

External links 
 Official website

Living people
1990 births
People from Réunion
French illustrators